This is presenting a complete list in alphabetical order of the twenty cricketers who played for Biman Bangladesh Airlines in first-class or List A matches during the 2000–01 season, the only one in which the team was functioning at the highest level of Bangladeshi cricket.

A
 Aamer Wasim (Pakistan)
 Aminul Islam
 Anwar Hossain Monir
 Atiar Rahman

F
 Faruk Ahmed

H
 Habibul Bashar
 Hasanuzzaman
 Humayun Rashid

I
 Imran Farhat (Pakistan)

J
 Jahangir Alam Talukdar
 Javed Omar

M
 Manzoor Akhtar (Pakistan)
 Mohammad Sharif
 Mukhtar Siddique

R
 Rafiqul Islam

S
 Saifullah Khan 	 	 	 	 
 Saleh Ahmed
 Sanwar Hossain
 Shariful Haque

Z
 Ziaur Rashid

References

Biman Bangladesh Airlines